Spartacus: Vengeance is the second season of the American television series Spartacus, a Starz television series, which follows Spartacus: Blood and Sand. It premiered on January 27, and concluded on March 30, 2012. Its story follows Spartacus (played by Liam McIntyre, who replaces Andy Whitfield on the role), after he and his fellow gladiators kill their master Batiatus and escape from his ludus, or gladiatorial training school. Cast members and characters who return from the first season include Lucy Lawless as Lucretia, Peter Mensah as Oenomaus, Manu Bennett as Crixus, Dan Feuerriegel as Agron, Nick E. Tarabay as Ashur, Viva Bianca as Ilithyia, and Craig Parker as Gaius Claudius Glaber. Dustin Clare also reprises his role as Gannicus from Spartacus: Gods of the Arena, the prequel to Spartacus: Blood and Sand.

On June 6, 2012, Starz and Anchor Bay Entertainment announced the season would be released in DVD and Blu-ray Disc formats on September 11, 2012, in a three-disc set. It was then announced that a third and final season will start in 2013 and would be known as Spartacus: War of the Damned.

Cast and characters

Main cast

Rebels
 Liam McIntyre as Spartacus – a Thracian slave who became a gladiator in the ludus of Quintus Batiatus. After the massacre at the House of Batiatus, Spartacus forms his own army and sets out to free the slaves of Rome.
 Peter Mensah as Oenomaus – formerly Doctore; Batiatus' taskmaster and trainer of gladiators, he becomes a trusted ally to Spartacus and his rebel army.
 Manu Bennett as Crixus – "The Undefeated Gaul", he was Batiatus' top gladiator before Spartacus' arrival, and then became Spartacus' chief rival at the ludus, but is now the second-in-command of Spartacus rebel army. Naevia's lover.
 Katrina Law as Mira – a slave who aided in Spartacus's escape. Now a fierce fighter and Spartacus' lover. She trains the other rebels with the bow.
 Dan Feuerriegel as Agron – a German gladiator who was sold to Batiatus' ludus, he was the first to join Spartacus in his revolt, where his brother Duro died. He is now one of Spartacus' trusted warriors. Nasir's lover.
 Dustin Clare as Gannicus – a former champion gladiator from the ludus who won his freedom in the arena some years before Spartacus' arrival (see Spartacus: Gods of the Arena). He returned to Capua and joined Spartacus' rebel army.
 Cynthia Addai-Robinson as Naevia – a slave who was banished from the ludus before the revolt. Crixus' lover.
 Pana Hema Taylor as Nasir – a Syrian former body slave who becomes one of the rebels. Agron's lover.
 Brooke Williams as Aurelia – Varro's widow (Spartacus' only real friend in the ludus), she is now grudgingly on the run with Spartacus' rebel army.
 Heath Jones as Donar – a German gladiator who becomes one of the chief warriors among the rebels.
 Ellen Hollman as Saxa – a German slave and warrior whom Agron frees. At first, she is Mira's rival but they eventually become friends. 
 Barry Duffield as Lugo – a dim-witted but courageous German warrior captured by the Romans and whom Agron frees.

Romans
 Lucy Lawless as Lucretia – Quintus Batiatus' widow and Ashur's unwilling lover, she was seriously injured from the wound she suffered at the hands of her ex-lover, Crixus. Her recovery was presented to the people of Rome as proof of Lucretia's personal connection with the gods, allegedly garnering her the gift of prophecy.
 Viva Bianca as Ilithyia – the daughter of Senator Albinius and wife of Glaber, now pregnant. Lucretia's trusted friend, before betraying the Batiatuses during Spartacus' revolt, she is resentful at being pulled back to Capua by Spartacus' rebellion. Ilithyia is later revealed to have secretly developed romantic feelings for Spartacus and became pregnant with his child; after their one-night stand.
 Craig Parker as Gaius Claudius Glaber – Ilithyia's husband and a praetor. Responsible for Spartacus' enslavement as a gladiator, he is now tasked with putting down the rebellion.
 Nick E. Tarabay as Ashur – a clever and scheming Syrian slave who narrowly escaped death during the massacre at the House of Batiatus. He is a now willing collaborator with the Romans to put down the slave rebellion and is Lucretia's co-conspirator. As with the previous series, his motivation for helping the Romans stems from greed and pure self-interest. After Ashur starts raping Lucretia, he forces her to become his lover.
 Brett Tucker as Publius Varinius – Glaber's chief political rival and fellow praetor.
 Tom Hobbs as Seppius – a young Capua citizen of note. He wishes to strip the honor of capturing Spartacus from Glaber.
 Hanna Mangan-Lawrence as Seppia – Seppius' flirtatious younger sister and Gaius' lover.
 Luke Pegler as Marcus – Glaber's military tribune.
 Jason Hood as Cossutius – a wealthy man who lives outside of Capua.

Episodes

Production
Spartacus series creator Steven S. DeKnight said in an interview, There are a "couple of very strong candidates" for the role of Spartacus, and season two should begin production in New Zealand in April [2011]. DeKnight added that the Spartacus producers and Starz executives weren't always sure they would go forward without Andy Whitfield, who they said had brought "gravity and heart" to the role of the famous warrior. "It's unheard of to recast your titular character in a television show, and we did a lot of soul searching about whether we even wanted to try", DeKnight said. "And then Andy [Whitfield] said, 'I really think the show should go forward without me. I give you the blessing. I want this story told.

On 17 January 2011, it was announced that Australian film and TV actor Liam McIntyre had been selected to replace Whitfield.

On 26 February 2011 interview with Entertainment Weekly, DeKnight revealed that the second season was set to air "the end of January" 2012. Additionally, he revealed that Lesley-Ann Brandt, the actress who portrayed the slave Naevia, would also not be able to return for season 2 due to the delay in production.

On 1 August 2011, Starz released a trailer indicating the new series would premiere in January 2012.

Broadcast
On November 7, 2011, Starz announced that the Spartacus premiere date was set for January 27, 2012.

Home video release

References

External links
 
 

2012 American television seasons
Spartacus (TV series)